Mohammad Rabey Hasani Nadwi (born 1 October 1929) is an Indian Sunni Islamic scholar, who serves as the president of All India Muslim Personal Law Board and the chancellor of Darul Uloom Nadwatul Ulama and patron Islamic Fiqh Academy, India. He is also the Vice President of the Aalami Rabita Adab-e-Islami, Riyadh (K.S.A.), a founding member of Muslim World League. He has been regularly listed among the 500 Most Influential Muslims of the world.
 

His disciples include Ijteba Nadwi.

Early life and education
Rabey Hasani Nadwi was born on 1 October 1929 at Takia Kalan, Raebareli, UP, India in the family of Rasheed Ahmad Hasani. 
He is a nephew of author and reformer Abul Hasan Ali Nadwi.

Nadwi gained primary education from his family maktab at Raebareli and joined Darul-uloom Nadwatul Ulama for higher studies. He graduated in 1957.

Career
Nadwi became Assistant Professor at Nadwatul Ulama, Lucknow in 1952, head of its Arabic Department in 1955, and the Dean of Faculty of Arabic in 1970.

He received an award from Indian Council Uttar Pradesh and a Presidential Award for his contribution to Arabic language and literature.

Nadwi became Vice Chancellor  of Nadwatul Ulama in 1993, Chancellor in 2000, and Rector after the death of Abul Hasan Ali Nadwi.

He succeeded Mujahidul Islam Qasmi as the President of All India Muslim Personal Law Board.

Literary works
 Life of Prophet Muhammad
 Indian Muslims: The Great 100
 Ghubar-e-Karwan

Legacy
A doctorate titled Indian contributions to Arabic literature: a study on Mohd Rabe Hasani Nadwi was written at the Assam University.

See also
 Syed Sulaiman Nadvi
 Mohammad Akram Nadwi
 Salman Husaini Nadwi

References

External links
Islamic Fiqh Academy, India
Muslim World League

20th-century Indian philosophers
1929 births
20th-century Muslim scholars of Islam
Urdu-language writers
Indian Sunni Muslim scholars of Islam
Living people
Academic staff of Darul Uloom Nadwatul Ulama
Deobandis
Darul Uloom Nadwatul Ulama alumni
Chancellors of Darul Uloom Nadwatul Ulama
Managers of Nadwatul Ulama
Disciples of Abul Hasan Ali Hasani Nadwi